Newbery is a surname.

Newbery may also refer to:
 Newbery Medal, a literary award
 Newbery Honor, a runner-up to this award

See also
 Newberry
 Newbury (disambiguation)